HEP or hep may refer to:

Science and medicine
 Hepatitis, a medical condition of the liver
 Hepatoerythropoietic porphyria, a blood disease
 High-energy physics
 Homotopy extension property, a property in algebraic topology
 Humane endpoint, predetermined stopping point in animal welfare practices to minimize animal distress and suffering
 Home exercise program

Technology
 Head-end power, a method for providing electricity to train carriages
 Heterogeneous Element Processor, the first commercial MIMD computer
 High-efficiency plasma, a type of lamp
 High-explosive plastic, a general-purpose ammunition
 Hotel electric power. electricity generated and used aboard a ship for general purposes
 Hydroelectric power, producing electrical energy through the use of moving water

Organisations
 Hep Records, a jazz record label in Scotland
 Hrvatska elektroprivreda, a Croatian power company
 People's Labor Party, pro-Kurdish political party in Turkey

Other
 HEP (shopping mall)
 Healthy eating pyramid
 Housing equity partnership
 Hep, a synonym for hip
 HEP (Latin: Hierosolyma est perdita or Jerusalem is lost); see cheering
 Human Exemptionalism Paradigm, a concept in environmental sociology

See also
 Hep-Hep riots, a series of antisemitic riots in Germany and neighbouring countries in 1819
 Hepp, a surname